Before You Go may refer to:

 Before You Go (novel), a 1960 novel by Jerome Weidman
 Before You Go (Buck Owens album), a 1965 album by Buck Owens and his Buckaroos
 "Before You Go" (Buck Owens song), 1965
 Before You Go (Blxst album), 2022
 "Before You Go" (Candice Alley song), 2007
 "Before You Go" (Lewis Capaldi song), 2019
 Before You Go (film), a 2002 comedy film directed by Lewis Gilbert
 Before You Go (play), a 1968 comedy play written by Lawrence Holofcener
 "Before You Go", a 2020 song by Moses Sumney from Græ